The  Tampa Bay Storm season was the 19th season for the franchise in the Arena Football League, and the 15th in the Tampa Bay area. The team was coached by Tim Marcum and played their home games at the St. Pete Times Forum.

Standings

Regular season schedule

Playoff schedule

References

Tampa Bay Storm
Tampa Bay Storm seasons
Tampa